Children of the Night was the second volume of poetry published by the American poet Edwin Arlington Robinson. While the volume was weakly received, President Theodore Roosevelt's son Kermit introduced the work to his father who, knowing his straits, secured Robinson a job at the NY Customs Office.

Content 
Notable poems include "John Evereldown", "Richard Cory", "Reuben Bright", and "Luke Havergal" which was included in Harold Bloom's Best Poems of the English Language.

In July 2008, Project Gutenberg released the 1905 printing of the 1897 edition, containing the following poems:

 The Children of the Night
 Three Quatrains
 The World
 An Old Story
 Ballade of a Ship
 Ballade by the Fire
 Ballade of Broken Flutes
 Ballade of Dead Friends
 Her Eyes
 Two Men
 Villanelle of Change
 John Evereldown
 Luke Havergal
 The House on the Hill
 Richard Cory
 Two Octaves
 Calvary
 Dear Friends
 The Story of the Ashes and the Flame
 For Some Poems by Matthew Arnold
 Amaryllis
 Kosmos
 Zola
 The Pity of the Leaves
 Aaron Stark
 The Garden
 Cliff Klingenhagen
 Charles Carville's Eyes
 The Dead Village
 Boston
 Two Sonnets
 The Clerks
 Fleming Helphenstine
 For a Book by Thomas Hardy
 Thomas Hood
 The Miracle
 Horace to Leuconoe
 Reuben Bright
 The Altar
 The Tavern
 Sonnet
 George Crabbe
 Credo
 On the Night of a Friend's Wedding
 Sonnet
 Verlaine
 Sonnet
 Supremacy
 The Night Before
 Walt Whitman
 The Chorus of Old Men in "Aegeus"
 The Wilderness
 Octaves
 Two Quatrains
 The two umbrellas

References

External links
 
 Bloom, Harold. The Best Poems of the English Language. 2004. 

American poetry collections